Sharaqpur Sharif is a town of Sheikhupura District in the Punjab province of Pakistan. The city is tehsil headquarters of Sharaq Pur Tehsil of Sheikhupura District.
Sharaqpur Sharif is also famous for Gulab Jamun and also known as City of Guava.The city is famous for the shrine of Hazrat Mian Sher Muhammad.

References

Populated places in Sheikhupura District